Cabral is a surname of Portuguese origin, coming from the word Cabra meaning goat. The surname Cabral most commonly came from goat farmers.

Notable people with the surname include:

Amílcar Cabral (1924–1973), Bissau-Guinean and Cape Verdean anti-colonial leader
Andrea Cabral (born 1959), American politician
Anna Escobedo Cabral (born 1959), American businesswoman, 42nd U.S. Treasurer
António Bernardo da Costa Cabral, 1st Marquis of Tomar (1803–1889), Portuguese statesman
Artur de Sacadura Cabral (1881–1924), Portuguese aviation pioneer
César Cabral (born 1989), Dominican professional baseball player
Chrystia Cabral (born 1991), American musician known professionally as Spellling
Cristina Rodríguez Cabral (born 1959), Uruguayan poet, researcher, and Afro-Uruguayan activist
Ciruelo Cabral (born 1963), Argentine fantasy artist
Donald Reid Cabral (1923–2006), President of the Dominican Republic
Esperanza Cabral, 21st century Filipino politician
Evaldo Cabral de Mello (born 1936), Brazilian historian and history writer
Facundo Cabral (1937–2011), Argentine singer and songwriter
Fito Cabrales, Spanish songwriter, singer and guitarist
Francisco Cabral (1529–1609), Portuguese Jesuit missionary in Japan
Gloria Cabral (born 1982), Brazilian-Paraguayan architect
Gonçalo Velho Cabral (15th century), Portuguese monk and explorer
João Cabral de Melo Neto, Brazilian poet
João Cabral, Portuguese Catholic missionary, seeker of the mystical land of Shambhala
João de Pina-Cabral, Portuguese anthropologist
Juan Bautista Cabral (1789–1813), Argentine soldier
Len Cabral, United States storyteller
Luís Cabral, first President of Guinea-Bissau
Manuel Caldeira Cabral (born 1968), Portuguese politician
Manuel del Cabral, Dominican writer
Maria da Conceição Nobre Cabral, Guinea-Bissau politician
Miguel de Sacadura Cabral Portas, Portuguese left-wing politician
Nilesh Cabral, Indian politician
Paulo de Sacadura Cabral Portas, Portuguese right-wing politician
Pedro Álvares Cabral (1467–1520), Portuguese discoverer of Brazil
Sérgio Cabral Filho (born 1963), Brazilian politician and journalist

Sports

Adilson Tavares Varela, commonly known as Cabral, Cape Verdean football player
Alejandro Cabral, Argentine footballer
Brian Cabral, American footballer
Cabral Ferreira, Portuguese football club president
Carlos Alberto Cabral, Brazilian football manager
Cristian Martins Cabral, Brazilian footballer
Gustavo Cabral, Argentine footballer
Jerson Cabral, Dutch footballer
Kévin Cabral, French footballer
Mário de Araújo Cabral, Portuguese racing driver
Milagros Cabral, Dominican Republic volleyball player
Paulo Cabral, Portuguese footballer
Rémi Cabral, French footballer

Portuguese-language surnames